The McKinley School, also known as North Side School, is a historic school building located at Seventeenth St. and Home Ave., in Columbus, Indiana. It was designed by architect Charles Franklin Sparrell and built in 1892.  It is a -story, five bay, Richardsonian Romanesque style red brick building with a limestone base and hipped roof.  It measures 73 feet wide and 38 feet deep.  An addition was erected in 1942, and measures approximately 127 feet wide and 38 feet deep.

It was listed on the National Register of Historic Places in 1988.

References

Columbus, Indiana
School buildings on the National Register of Historic Places in Indiana
School buildings completed in 1892
Richardsonian Romanesque architecture in Indiana
Buildings and structures in Bartholomew County, Indiana
National Register of Historic Places in Bartholomew County, Indiana